This list contains the present and former international football players playing in Nemzeti Bajnokság, their nationality, the number of international games/matches in the league they played, the number of goals they scored on them, the duration between their first and last appearance in the league, and the teams they were playing for. (The list only contains those players whom appeared in the top division.)

The last time this article was refreshed: . . .

Players written in bold are still playing in the league.

The list of players

Players appeared at FIFA World Cup

Gallery

References

External links 
 

Hungary
international footballers
Association football player non-biographical articles